Pishukan , is a town on the western shore of the Gwadar West Bay, north of the Arabian Sea, in Pakistan. It is a union council of Gwadar Tehsil in the Gwadar District of Balochistan province of Pakistan. The town has a population of 12,000.

History
The town has been affected by the ongoing conflict between pro-independence Baloch nationalists and the Government of Pakistan. In May 2017 ten construction and road workers were killed by members of the Balochistan Liberation Army.

Pishukan is a major conduit for people smuggling, arms smuggling, and for drug smuggling. The town was mentioned in 1909 as the landing site for up to 1,500 rifles which were being smuggled into Balochistan.

In June 2022, the Indian Coast Guard intercepted  of heroine being transported from Pishukan to the coast of Kutch District in Gujarat, India.

Climate

Pishukan has a hot desert climate (Köppen climate classification BWh) with hot summers and warm winters. Most rainfall falls in winter, although there is sometimes a little rain in the monsoon season (July–August) as well. In January 2022 the town suffered from heavy flooding, resulting in the destruction of many mud houses. Rescue efforts in the area were coordinated by the Pakistan Coast Guards.

Economy
The economy of the town has long been focussed on fishing with reports of this from as far back as 1908. Plans for a new fishing harbour were announced in 2002.

There are plans for the fishing jetty of Gwadar to be moved to Pishukan at some point in the future. An area of  has been earmarked for the use of the Pakistan Navy.

Transport
Transport facilities are dominated by the development of nearby Gwadar.

See also
 Jiwani, a coastal town to the west of Pishukan

References

Coastal cities and towns in Pakistan
Populated places in Gwadar District
Union councils of Balochistan, Pakistan